Lethariella cladonioides, locally known as lu xin xue cha (literally "deer heart snow tea") or hong xue cha (literally "red snow tea"), is a fruticose lichenized species of fungus in the family Parmeliaceae. It is distributed throughout Southwest and Northwest China (including eastern Tibet, western Sichuan, northwestern Yunnan, southern Shaanxi, and northwestern Gansu), India, Nepal, Pakistan, and Kashmir. It is used as traditional medicine and health-promoting tea in China for treatment and prevention of sore throats, high blood pressure, inflammation, dizziness and neurasthenia.

References

Parmeliaceae
Lichen species
Lichens described in 1860
Taxa named by William Nylander (botanist)
Lichens of Asia